Is It Just Me or Is Everything Shit?: The Encyclopedia of Modern Life is a book by Steve Lowe and Alan McArthur. It was published in Britain in 2005. The authors give satirical criticisms of people, places, institutions and phenomena seen in modern British life. Subjects include Live 8, 50 Cent, Chris Martin, Philip Green and The Daily Mail. The jacket copy describes the book as a "broadside against consumer capitalism," and this is a recurring theme throughout. The book displays a broadly left-wing view of life.

The book was also made available as an audio CD read by Julian Rhind-Tutt and Stephen Mangan.

Volume Two

In November 2006, Is It Just Me Or Is Everything Shit?: Volume Two was released as a sequel, with the same authors turning their attentions to Lemsip medicine and Bratz dolls amongst other subjects. The book features the tagline "Because if anything, it all just keeps getting worse". It covers much the same territory as the other volume, presenting a sarcastic, grumbling view of modern consumerism, politics and popular culture. Other subjects include David Cameron, James Blunt and ready meals.

External links
 A website about the book

Popular culture books
2005 non-fiction books
Current affairs books
English non-fiction literature
Little, Brown and Company books
2006 non-fiction books